Buxton School may refer to:

 Buxton School, Leytonstone, a state-maintained school in Leytonstone, London, England
 Buxton School (Massachusetts), a private school in Williamstown, Massachusetts, United States

See also
 Buxton (disambiguation)